Tarqeq, also known as Saturn LII (provisional designation S/2007 S 1) is a natural satellite of Saturn. Its discovery was announced by Scott S. Sheppard, David C. Jewitt, Jan Kleyna, and Brian G. Marsden on 13 April 2007 from observations taken between 5 January 2006 and 22 March 2007. It is named after Tarqeq, the Inuit moon god, and is a member of the Inuit group of irregular satellites. It is about seven kilometres in diameter. The Cassini spacecraft observed Tarqeq over 1.5 days on 15–16 January 2014. 

The Tarqiupian (Tarqeqian) orbit lies at an inclination of 49.90° (to the ecliptic; 49.77° to Saturn's equator), with an eccentricity of 0.1081 and a semi-major axis of 17.9106 Gm. Tarqeq orbits in a prograde direction with a period of 894.86 days.

This is very close to a 1:5 resonance with Titan's orbital period, suggesting that gravitational interactions possibly lock Tarqeq in a mean-motion resonance.

It has very similar inclination and semi-major axis as Siarnaq, suggesting that it is a fragment of the latter.

References 

Moons of Saturn
Inuit group
Irregular satellites
Discoveries by Brett J. Gladman
Astronomical objects discovered in 2000
Moons with a prograde orbit